The 2013–14 San Diego Toreros men's basketball team represented the University of San Diego during the 2013–14 NCAA Division I men's basketball season. This was head coach Bill Grier's seventh season at San Diego. The Toreros competed in the West Coast Conference and played their home games at the Jenny Craig Pavilion. They finished the season 18–17, 7–11 in WCC play to finish in a tie for sixth place. They lost in the quarterfinals of the WCC tournament to San Francisco. They were invited to the CollegeInsider.com Postseason Tournament where they defeated Portland State and Sam Houston State to advance to the quarterfinals where they lost to fellow WCC member Pacific.

Before the season

Departures

Recruits

Roster

Schedule and results

|-
!colspan=9 style="background:#002654; color:#97CAFF;"| Exhibition

|-
!colspan=12 style="background:#97CAFF; color:#002654;"| Non-conference regular season

|-
!colspan=12 style="background:#002654; color:#97CAFF;"| WCC regular season

|-
!colspan=9 style="background:#97CAFF; color:#002654;"| WCC tournament
 
|-
!colspan=9 style="background:#002654; color:#97CAFF;"| CIT

Source:

Game summaries

Exhibition: Cal State Monterey Bay

South Dakota State
Series History: First Meeting

Grand Canyon
Series History: Grand Canyon leads 10-8
Broadcasters: Matt Rosen, Rex Chapman & Barry Buetel

Morgan State
Series History: San Diego leads series 1-0

Northern Kentucky
Series History: First Meeting

Gulf Coast Showcase: San Diego Christian
Series History: San Diego leads series 3-0
Broadcasters: Eddie Doucette, Kevin O'Neill & Laura McKeeman

Gulf Coast Showcase: UIC
Series History: First Meeting

Gulf Coast Showcase: UNC Greensboro
Series History: First Meeting

Gulf Coast Showcase: Southern Illinois
Series History: San Diego leads series 1-0

New Mexico
Series History: New Mexico leads 6-2
Broadcasters: Barry Tompkins & Dave Bollwinkel

San Diego State
Series History: San Diego State leads 27-17
Broadcasters: Eddie Doucette, Kevin O'Neill & Cassie Gallo

Pacifica
Series History: First Meeting

UC Santa Barbara
Series History: UC Santa Barbara leads 15-6
Broadcasters: Eddie Doucette, Kevin O'Neill & Stacey Sladen

Southern Utah
Series History: San Diego leads series 10-0

Pepperdine
Series History: Pepperdine leads 56-40
Broadcaster: Al Epstein

Loyola Marymount
Series History: Series tied 43-43

BYU
Series History: BYU leads 6-2Broadcasters: Dave McCann, David Nixon & Spencer Linton

Loyola Marymount
Series History: Loyola Marymount leads 34-33
Broadcasters: Ari Wolfe & Jon Crispin

Pepperdine
Series History: Pepperdine leads 57-40
Broadcasters: Eddie Doucette, Brad Holland & Laura McKeeman

Santa Clara
Series History: Santa Clara leads 41-33

See also
2013–14 San Diego Toreros women's basketball team

References

San Diego Toreros men's basketball seasons
San Diego
San Diego
San Diego Toreros men's basketball
San Diego Toreros men's basketball